Astrid Hadad (born 1957) is a Mexican vocalist and performer, mostly known for her irreverent political cabaret performances where she uses her own body as the scenic stage for all the symbols of Mexicanness and excessive femininity through her costuming. Hadad was born in Chetumal, Quintana Roo, Mexico and currently lives in Mexico City. Of Mayan and Lebanese heritage, growing up near the Belize border and able to hear Caribbean radio stations coming from Cuba, has been hugely influential for her heterogenous perspective on social and cultural national life. Coupled with that, her incessant desire to critique the powers that be, her background as a political science major in college, her ongoing explorations in non-traditional theatrical forms, is all that fuels Hadad's unique political cabaret performances. As Roselyn Constantino has written, "[o]ut of Hadad´s meditations on the multiplicity of influences shaping her and other Mexican's sense of themselves, and on the violence implicity in that process, emerge performances featuring a fast-paced, fragmented, parodic unveiling of traditional Mexican song, dress, and dance. Hadad avails herself of the humorous sociopolitical criticism of cabaret, carpa, and teatro de revista--important theatrical styles in Mexican cultural history."

Education 
Before moving to Mexico City to attend the National Autonomous University of Mexico's Theatre School (Centro Universitario de Teatro), Hadad was enrolled at the Universidad Veracruzana were she was a political science and journalism major.

Early career 
After appearing in a number of theatrical shows, she came to the fore in 1985 in Donna Giovanni, an all-female adaptation of Mozart's opera, which was directed by Jesusa Rodríguez and became a great hit in Europe. It closed after its 500th performance, in the Palacio de Bellas Artes in Mexico City. Also in the 1980's, a major television appearance was her role as Margarita in the Televisa produced telenovela Teresa (1989), which starred fellow Mexican Lebanese actor Salma Hayek. And, in the early 1990's Hadad was cast in the role of Teresa de Teresa in Alfonso Cuarón's first full-feature film, Sólo con tu pareja (Only With Your Partner), a film that, although light-hearted and comedic, includes AIDS in its story, something not openly discussed in the Mexican public sphere at that time. This multi-faceted set of experiences, coupled with Hadad's desire to interpret popular songs from the Latin American / Mexican songbook in her own particular way, led to her explorations of (political) cabaret.

Early political cabaret performances and influences
Some of Hadad's early explorations in political cabaret included two shows: Nostalgia Arrabalera and Del Rancho a la Ciudad. This led to her producing and starring in the tragicomic musical La Occisa or Luz, Levántate y Lucha based on the life of Mexican singer Lucha Reyes (1904-1944), a very famous ranchera singer. Lucha Reyes is the one who started what Hadad calls "canto bravío" in Mexico. Hadad states in an interview in 1997 "traditionally women would sing the campirana song or bucolic songs with soft voices, with very high pitch. Women did not use the same force in singing compared to a man and Lucha (Reyes) is the one who initiates this type of ranchera singing in a bravía way among women. Because of that she changed the vernacular song".  Another influences in the production of Hadad are the teatro de carpa (Tent theater, similar to street theater), and teatro de revista, two forms of the so-called género chico or “light” theater developed in Mexico from the late 1880s to the 1930s, and specially the "rumbera" films from the Golden Age of Mexican cinema (40s - 60s) whose plots were set primarily in cabarets. The principal stars were the actresses and dancers known as "Rumberas". Ms. Hadad says her act also has its origins in the German cabaret of Bertolt Brecht and Kurt Weill, “the political cabaret that was a new way of experiencing life” In the 1920s and 1930s, Mexico City's clubs were also filled with performers who skewered the powerful in their acts. But no one since has stuffed all of Mexican political and cultural history into a dress and laced it up with a feminist attitude quite like Ms. Hadad.
In a way, one could say that Hadad's wild cabaret is a little like a Frida Kahlo painting come to life. Like Frida, she draws from the rich motherlode of images offered up by Mexican history and culture: Catholic saints, Aztec and Mayan iconography, revolutionary heroes, exuberant flowers and plants, campesino and indigenous folk art, the golden era of Mexican cinema and so on.

Notable political cabaret performances 
Out of the production La Occisa or Luz, Levántate y Lucha, came Hadad's collaboration with the musical group that has accompanied her since, Los Tarzanes. Together, they have created various performances (La Mujer Ladrina, Apocalipsis Ranchero, La Mujer del Golfo, etc.).  In her Heavy Nopal show, Astrid makes use of iconic references, not just as scenery (the cactus, the rock, the pyramid, the tequila bottle), but also on her own body, becoming not only the stage, but also an altar. From the calla lilies to the extremely complex surprise-multi-purpose outfits to the innumerable ornaments, "rebozos", virgins of Guadalupe, guns, and common places in the essence of Mexico. Someone once described Astrid as a "walking museum of popular cultures."

Pecadora is a comic show that has women as a central theme, using Mary Magdalene, sinner par excellence, as the leading thread. It is a show that aims at rescuing the passion from the dangers of extinction where it can be currently found. In it, Astrid retakes the spirit of the rumberas, the soul of the rancheras and the historical body of everything Mexican. Of course, all this seasoned with a loud wardrobe, where hearts, gigantic eyes, turquoise-blue dresses and an old lantern, among others, play before the eyes of the audience.

In Sol y Sombra, taking as an excuse the novel Dr. Jekyll and Mr. Hyde, Astrid presents a show where, setting the forces of evil against those of goodness, she leads us to reflect on (through her sense of humor) our inner ghosts as well as on the joys of life. This show boasts a very colorful wardrobe and scenery, in which the use of "papel picado" is an important stage element. ("Papel picado" is a thin colored paper with different shapes cut out, used as a decoration on holidays in Mexico.) As for this show it requires an arch-shaped structure to hang from as part of the scenery and the show, it is somewhat bulky to carry.

The last performance of the show called "Oh-diosas", (which is a play on words meaning something like "bitchies / Oh - goddesses") was at the end of the month of July 2006 in Mexico City, in one of the boroughs called Colonia Condesa.

Other shows by Hadad include Corazón sangrante and La multimamada. “Corazon Sangrante” is a 40s-style bolero and rumba that Hadad wrote of the Aztec king Montezuma whose “heart was bathed in chile” after he was betrayed by Cortez. “Where can I go, where can I put heart, so it won’t hurt, won’t bleed…” she croons as she dances across the stage in a velvet gown adorned with golden pyramids, an outfit she describes as representing the syncretic nature (European and Indigenous) of Mexican culture.
If this sounds like a history lesson, it is, but it's hysterically funny. For her farewell number, she prances around the stage in a big sombrero with a moving rubber hand sticking up from the center. “Yes, this hand is for self-pleasure,” she quips, “It comes in three speeds.” The band picks up the tempo and Hadad reaches inside the brim to grab confetti, which she tosses into the air.

Astrid has also starred in TV soaps and in the film Sólo con tu pareja.

Astrid Hadad's discography includes recorded performances and singing.

Discography 

 1990 - ¡Ay! (it was reissued later two times as El Calcetín (The Sock) with different covers and added bonuses)
 1995 - Corazón Sangrante (Bleeding Heart)
 1998 - Mexican Divas (participación especial, recopilaciones) (Compilation)
 2000 - Heavy Nopal en vivo (Heavy Nopal Live)
 2000 - Cabaret 2000 (recopilación de canciones), con Eugenia León y Liliana Felipe. (Compilation)
 2003 - La Cuchilla (The blade)
 2004 - Soy Virgencita y mucho más... (I am a virgin) (Compilation)
 2007 – Pecadora (Sinner)
 2007 - ¡Oh! Diosas (Oh! Goddesses)
 2011 - Tierra Misteriosa (Mysterious Land)
 2013 - Vivir Muriendo (Living & dying)
 2017 - Caprichos (Caprices)
 2022 - La Pluma o La Espada (The Pen or the Sword)

Films 
1991 – Film  “SOLO CON TU PAREJA”, Director Alfonso Cuarón.

2014 –Cabaret Singer in  “AMOR DE MIS AMORES” of  Manolo Caro.

Television 
Soap operas (telenovelas), e.g. “Teresa”, Televisa Mexico.
HBO: “Pecadora”, “Heavy Nopal” and documentaries for the BBC and HBO.

References

External links
  Official Website

1957 births
Mexican people of Lebanese descent
Mexican women singers
Mexican stage actresses
Mexican telenovela actresses
Actresses from Quintana Roo
People from Chetumal, Quintana Roo
Living people
Lesbian actresses
Mexican feminists
Mexican performance artists
21st-century LGBT people